Peter Hansen (born 18 November 1921) was a Danish rower. He competed at the 1952 Summer Olympics in Helsinki with the men's coxed four where they were eliminated in the semi-final repêchage.

References

External links
 

1921 births
Possibly living people
Danish male rowers
Olympic rowers of Denmark
Rowers at the 1952 Summer Olympics
Sportspeople from Aarhus
European Rowing Championships medalists